3 Phasis is an album by Cecil Taylor recorded in April 1978 and released on the New World label. The album features three performances by Taylor with Raphe Malik, Jimmy Lyons, Ramsey Ameen, Sirone and Ronald Shannon Jackson. The album was recorded during the same sessions that produced the Cecil Taylor Unit.

Track listing 
All compositions by Cecil Taylor.
 "3 Phasis" – 57:12 
 Recorded in April 1978

Personnel 
 Cecil Taylor: piano
 Jimmy Lyons: alto saxophone
 Raphe Malik: trumpet
 Ramsey Ameen: violin
 Sirone: bass
 Ronald Shannon Jackson: drums

References 

1978 albums
Cecil Taylor albums
New World Records albums